Angles is the debut album by dan le sac vs Scroobius Pip, released on 12 May 2008. It entered and peaked at #31 on the UK album chart. Most of the album was recorded in a friend of Scroobius Pip's shed in Essex and dan le sac's back bedroom.

Track listing 

Also released was an iTunes Bonus Video Version with a shortened version of "Waiting for the Beat to Kick In...", and the track "Reading My Dreams" was used as a separate track.

When the album was released in the United States by Strange Famous Records, it had a different track listing.

Production notes 
 "Fixed" features a sample from Dizzee Rascal's "Fix Up, Look Sharp", which itself is a sample of Billy Squier's "The Big Beat".
 "Letter from God to Man" features a sample from Radiohead's song "Planet Telex", a song featured on the album The Bends. It was also made available as a free download  from the band's MySpace website on Christmas Day, 2007.

References 

2008 debut albums
Dan le Sac Vs Scroobius Pip albums
Strange Famous Records albums